The discography of the American rock band Saliva consists of ten studio albums, one compilation album, one extended play, twenty-three singles and thirteen music videos.

Albums

Studio albums

Compilation albums

Extended plays

Singles

Guest appearances

Music videos

Notes

References

External links
 
 
 

Discographies of American artists
Rock music group discographies
Heavy metal group discographies